Bogra-7 is a constituency represented in the Jatiya Sangsad (National Parliament) of Bangladesh since 2019 by independent politician Rezaul Karim Bablu.

Boundaries 
The constituency encompasses Gabtali and Shajahanpur upazilas.

History 
The constituency was created for the first general elections in newly independent Bangladesh, held in 1973.

Ahead of the 2008 general election, the Election Commission redrew constituency boundaries to reflect population changes revealed by the 2001 Bangladesh census. The 2008 redistricting altered the boundaries of the constituency.

Members of Parliament

Elections

Elections in the 2010s

Elections in the 2000s 
Khaleda Zia stood for three seats in the 2008 general election: Bogra-6, Bogra-7, and Feni-1. After winning all three, she chose to represent Feni-1 and quit the other two, triggering by-elections in them. Moudud Ahmed of the BNP was elected in an April 2009 by-election.

Khaleda Zia stood for five seats in the 2001 general election: Bogra-6, Bogra-7, Khulna-2, Feni-1, and Lakshmipur-2. After winning all five, she chose to represent Bogra-6 and quit the other four, triggering by-elections in them. Helaluzzaman Talukder Lalu of the BNP was elected in a November 2001 by-election.

Elections in the 1990s 
Khaleda Zia stood for five seats in the June 1996 general election: Bogra-6, Bogra-7, Feni-1, Lakshmipur-2 and Chittagong-1. After winning all five, she chose to represent Feni-1 and quit the other four, triggering by-elections in them. Helaluzzaman Talukder Lalu was elected in a September 1996 by-election.

Khaleda Zia stood for five seats in the 1991 general election: Bogra-7,  Dhaka-5, Dhaka-9, Feni-1, and Chittagong-8. After winning all five, she chose to represent Feni-1 and quit the other four, triggering by-elections in them. Helaluzzaman Talukder Lalu of the BNP was elected in a September 1991 by-election.

References

External links
 

Parliamentary constituencies in Bangladesh
Bogura District